Annie Jones (born Annika Jancso; 13 January 1967) is an Australian actress, known for her roles in soap operas and serials, most especially Sons and Daughters  as Jess Campbell, in  Neighbours as Jane Harris and Newlyweds as Allie Carter. She has won two Logie Awards.

Early life
Born Annika Jancso on 13 January 1967, Jones' parents were Hungarian immigrants, who met when in Adelaide and married after her father found employment as an opal miner. She has three older sisters. The family spent many years in Coober Pedy.

Career
Professionally taking the stage name Annie Jones, she undertook some modelling, before beginning acting at aged 17 in the title role in the film drama Run Chrissie Run!  She then appeared in television roles on The Henderson Kids (1985), and Sons and Daughters (1985–1986) as Jesse Campbell.

Jones auditioned for the role of Charlene Mitchell (which she lost to Kylie Minogue) in the television soap opera Neighbours, at age 19. She eventually landed the role of Jane Harris in 1986, and would continue in that role until 1989. Jones received the Logie Award for Most Popular Actress for the role. In April 1988, Jones presented a report on the opening day of World Expo 88 for Network Ten.

Post-Neighbours in 1990, she played an opal miner's daughter in an episode of TV series The Flying Doctors and played the title role in the drama miniseries Jackaroo, which won her a second Logie Award for Most Popular Actress in a Telemovie or Mini-series in 1991. She also starred as Eva Kovac in the historical mini-series Snowy (1993).

Jones starred as Allie Carter in the Australian sitcom Newlyweds with Christopher Gabardi in 1993 and 1994. She guest starred in The Adventures of Lano & Woodley in 1997. 

Jones played mother Sue Green in children's television series Pig's Breakfast, and appeared in the Mortified episode "Mother in the Nude" (2006). 

Jones has guest starred in many Australian series including  City Homicide (2007), Stingers (2003), Blue Heelers (1994, 2002), Marshall Law (2002), Good Guys, Bad Guys (1997) and Halifax f.p. (1996).

In 2010, she was cast in the television movie Underbelly Files: Tell Them Lucifer was Here, which tells of the biggest criminal investigation in the history of the state of Victoria. Jones played parole officer Rachel Sanger in three episodes of Wentworth in 2013. She also appeared in the 2014 Australian show Worst Year of My Life Again. 

In March 2015, she took part in a documentary special, Neighbours 30th: The Stars Reunite, celebrating the show's 30th anniversary. The following year, Jones was reunited with her Neighbours co-star Guy Pearce when she guested in his drama series Jack Irish. She also filmed guest appearances in the Seven Network drama Winners & Losers, and The Doctor Blake Mysteries.

In April 2018, she reprised the role of Jane Harris in Neighbours. In 2019, Jones starred as Colleen Cotterill in Seven Network's Secret Bridesmaids' Business, which was based on the stage play by Elizabeth Coleman. On 27 June 2020, it was announced that Jones had reprised the Neighbours role as a permanent cast member and she remained in the role until the show's then final episode on 28 July 2022. The series was later picked up by streaming service Amazon Freevee and Jones was confirmed to be reprising her role in February 2023.

Personal life
Jones has been married to director Paul Moloney since 1989. The couple met on the set of The Henderson Kids.

After leaving Neighbours in 1989, Jones put her acting career on hold for 15 years to take care of her mother, who had Alzheimer's disease. Jones stated "She had the disease for many, many years and I became her carer. Anyone who has had anything to do with Alzheimer's or dementia will know what it's like. It's heart-breaking, seeing someone disappear before your eyes. Because of that, I had neither the time nor the energy to commit to a long-running series and could only do guest roles here and there."

Filmography

Film

Television

References

External links

1967 births
20th-century Australian actresses
21st-century Australian actresses
Actresses from Adelaide
Australian people of Hungarian descent
Australian film actresses
Australian television actresses
Living people
Logie Award winners